Operation Fusilade was the plan for a set piece assault on the French port of Dieppe during the Second World War. In the event, the German occupiers, not having received orders to hold the town, evacuated shortly before Fusilade, which was cancelled. The 8th Reconnaissance Regiment (14th Canadian Hussars) of the 2nd Canadian Division entered the town unopposed on September 1, 1944, to a warm welcome from the French inhabitants. The planned bombing of the town was hastily cancelled. The nearby small fishing port of Le Treport was taken on the same day by the 3rd Canadian Division. Some days later, there was a memorial ceremony at the nearby Canadian military cemetery to honour the interred men killed in the 1942 Dieppe Raid.

Aftermath
The Germans had only partly demolished the port facilities and bridges and the first ships unloaded on 6 September. A train left on 9 September with petrol and oil for Brussels. Dieppe was able to supply a quarter of the needs of the 21st Army Group.

References

See also
 Clearing the Channel Coast

Operation Overlord
Battles of World War II involving Canada
Dieppe
Cancelled military operations of World War II